Arch Higgins (born Berkeley, California) was a soloist with New York City Ballet. He began his study at eight years with Berkeley Ballet Theater with former City Ballet dancer Sally Streets. From 1982 he attended summer courses at the School of American Ballet which he entered full-time on scholarship four years later. He was the recipient of the Mae L. Wien Award and joined the NYCB corps de ballet in 1989. Higgins was promoted to soloist in 1998 and danced until 2011. He is now a guest teacher for the company and assistant children's ballet master.

Rôles

originated featured rôles

David Allan 
 Pastoral Dances

John Alleyne 
 The New Blondes

Robert La Fosse 
 Duke! (Rockin' in Rhythm)

Miriam Mahdaviani 
 Appalachia Waltz
 Correlazione

Peter Martins 
 Reliquary

Trey McIntyre 
 Rain
 Steel

Kevin O'Day 
 Swerve Poems

Jerome Robbins 
 West Side Story Suite

Susan Stroman 
 Double Feature (Makin' Whoopee!)

Christopher Wheeldon 
 Carnival of the Animals
 Carousel (A Dance)

featured rôles

George Balanchine 
 Agon
 Allegro Brillante
 Le Bourgeois Gentilhomme
 Chaconne
 Divertimento No. 15
 Episodes
 The Four Temperaments
 Haieff Divertimento
 Jewels (Emeralds)
 A Midsummer Night's Dream
 Mozartiana
 The Nutcracker (Balanchine)
 Prodigal Son
 Robert Schumann's Davidsbündlertänze
 Symphony in C
 Symphony in Three Movements
 Tschaikovsky Piano Concerto No. 2
 Union Jack
 La Valse
 Vienna Waltzes

Peter Martins 

 Ash
 Delight of the Muses
 Les Gentilhommes
 Jazz (Six Syncopated Movements)
 Les petits riens
 The Sleeping Beauty
 Slonimsky's Earbox
 Swan Lake
 Symphonic Dances

Jerome Robbins 

 Dances at a Gathering
 Fancy Free
 Fanfare
 Glass Pieces
 The Goldberg Variations
 I'm Old Fashioned
 Interplay
 In the Night
 Ives, Songs

References 

New York City Ballet soloists
American male ballet dancers
Mae L. Wien Award recipients
Living people
Year of birth missing (living people)
School of American Ballet alumni